Kabbadi World Cup may refewndf
r to:

 Kabaddi World Cup (Standard style), an indoor international competition conducted by the International Kabaddi Federation
 Kabaddi World Cup (Circle style), an annual international competition administrated by the Government of Punjab, India